Alexandra Soler (born 14 October 1983 in Béziers) is a French former artistic gymnast. She competed at the 2000 Summer Olympics.

References

External links

1983 births
Living people
Sportspeople from Béziers
French female artistic gymnasts
Gymnasts at the 2000 Summer Olympics
Olympic gymnasts of France
21st-century French women